Julia Heron (November 21, 1897 – April 9, 1977) was an American set decorator. She won an Academy Award and was nominated for four more in the category Best Art Direction. She worked on more than 100 films between 1930 and 1968.

Selected filmography
Heron won an Academy Award for Best Art Direction and was nominated for four more:

Won
 Spartacus (1960)

Nominated
 The Big Fisherman (1959)
 Casanova Brown (1944)
 Jungle Book (1942)
 That Hamilton Woman (1941)

References

External links

1897 births
1977 deaths
American set decorators
Artists from Montana
Best Art Direction Academy Award winners